Lophocampa annulosa, the Santa Ana tussock moth, is a moth of the family Erebidae. It was described by Francis Walker in 1855. It is found in the south-western US (southern Texas, southern Arizona), Mexico, Costa Rica, Ecuador, Venezuela, Peru, Suriname, Brazil, Argentina and Trinidad.

Adults are tan with chainlike light brown markings and a brown line with a small white dot.

Larvae have been recorded feeding on Aegiphila falcata.

References

  Retrieved April 21, 2018.
Lophocampa annulosa at BOLD Systems

annulosa
Moths described in 1855